Morleys Stores is a group of eight department stores in Greater London, a business-to-business furniture supply subsidiary called Morley's of Bicester Ltd and a department store & furniture centre called Camp Hopson of Newbury in Newbury, Berkshire. The group is named after the original store that opened in Brixton, south London as Morley & Lanceley. Note that the firm is unrelated to the London fast foods restaurant chain.

In the year to January 2014 group profit was £5.6 million on turnover of £90.6 million.

Department stores
Morleys is a member of the Solihull-based Associated Independent Stores buying group, the supplier of non-food goods to 350 companies with about 600 small and medium-sized independent outlets with textile and other non-food goods.

History
The Brixton Road shop originally traded as Morley & Lanceley. In 2009 Morleys bought Roomes Fashion and Home in Upminster and in 2010 it bought the Pearsons stores in Enfield and Bishop's Stortford. Smith Bros in Tooting was rebranded Morleys on 1 November 2010 and the Pearsons store in Bishop's Stortford, Hertfordshire closed during 2012.

In November 2014, Morley's purchased Camp Hopson of Newbury which consists of a department store and furniture centre.

In November 2016, it was confirmed that Morleys had signed up for its ninth store, taking over the vacated former British Home Stores premises at Broadway Shopping Centre, Bexleyheath. The new store opened in spring 2017.

Stores 
List of current Morleys Group stores as of 2023.

Morleys

 Bexleyheath
 Brixton
 Tooting (formerly Smith Bros of Tooting)

Other branding

 Pearsons (Located in Enfield)
 Selby's (Located in Holloway) (Formerly James Selby)
 Camp Hopson (Located in Newbury)
 Roomes (Located in Upminster)
 Elys (Located in Wimbledon)

Defunct

 Bodgers (Located in Illford) (Closed in 2018)

Morley's of Bicester
In 1929 the Brixton store started selling contract furniture, eventually expanding and moving to Bicester. It acquired the similar businesses of Duncan Roberts Ltd in 2002 and Principal Furniture Ltd in 2005.

Camp Hopson of Newbury
In 1854 Joseph Hopson opened a furniture business on West Street, Newbury. In 1886, Alfred Camp opened a drapery bazaar on Northbrook Street. The business ran as separate entities until 1920, when Paul Hopson, grandson of Joseph, married the daughter of Alfred, Norah, and the companies were merged to form Camp Hopson.

References

Department stores of the United Kingdom
Shops in London
Buildings and structures in the London Borough of Enfield
Buildings and structures in the London Borough of Havering
Buildings and structures in the London Borough of Islington
Buildings and structures in the London Borough of Lambeth
History of the London Borough of Lambeth
Buildings and structures in the London Borough of Merton
Buildings and structures in the London Borough of Redbridge
Buildings and structures in the London Borough of Wandsworth
1897 establishments in England
Companies based in Oxfordshire